The 1918 Camp Dix football team represented the United States Army's Camp Dix located near Trenton, New Jersey, during the 1918 college football season. Sol Metzger was the camp's Y.M.C.A. athletic director and the coach of the football team.

Schedule

References

Camp Dix
Camp Dix football